Colin Edward Breed (born 4 May 1947 in Surrey) is a British Liberal Democrat politician. He was the  Member of Parliament (MP) for South East Cornwall from 1997 until he stood down at the 2010 general election. He was also member of the parliamentary party's Treasury team.

Early life
He was born in north-east Surrey, the son of a chef and he was educated at Torquay Boys' Grammar School. He was appointed as an area manager with the Midland Bank in 1964. After 17 years with the bank, he became the managing director of Rowan Dartington & Co Ltd in 1981, before becoming a director with Gemini Abrasives in 1992 until his election to Westminster.

Political career
Breed was elected as a councillor to both the Caradon District Council and to the Saltash Town Council in 1982.  He was twice selected as the Mayor of Saltash.  He was selected to contest the constituency of Cornwall South East at the 1997 general election, when the sitting Conservative MP Robert Hicks was retiring. The 1997 general election saw losses for the Conservatives across the UK and Breed was comfortably elected as the new Liberal Democrat MP for Cornwall South East with a majority of 6,480. He made his maiden speech on 24 June 1997 on the preservation of plant varieties.

In Parliament, Breed was appointed as a Liberal Democrat spokesman on Trade and Industry by Paddy Ashdown in 1997. When Charles Kennedy was elected as the Leader of the Liberal Democrats in 1999, Breed was promoted to the Liberal Democrat Shadow Cabinet as the Shadow Agriculture minister. In the same year he became a member of the General Medical Council.

Breed was dropped from the Liberal Democrat Shadow Cabinet following the 2001 general election, but was appointed as a spokesman on the Environment, Food and Rural Affairs, before moving to speak on Defence in 2002.  He returned to be a spokesman on the Environment, Food and Rural Affairs following the 2005 General Election.

He stood down from Parliament in April 2010, at 62 years of age, and did not seek re-election. His seat was lost to the Conservatives.

Personal life
Breed is a Methodist lay preacher and voted conservatively on issues such as homosexuality.  He married Janet Courtiour in 1968 in Torbay and they have a son and a daughter.

References

External links

 Profile at ePolitix.com

News articles
 Announcing retirement in October 2007
 Easter Sunday shopping in April 2006
 Ginsters Cornish pasties in March 2005
 Saltash tunnel in June 2003

1947 births
Living people
Liberal Democrats (UK) MPs for English constituencies
Members of the Parliament of the United Kingdom for constituencies in Cornwall
Politicians from Cornwall
UK MPs 1997–2001
UK MPs 2001–2005
UK MPs 2005–2010
British Methodists
People educated at Torquay Boys' Grammar School
Councillors in Cornwall
20th-century English politicians
21st-century English politicians
Liberal Democrats (UK) councillors